Edward Burby was  an English priest in the  17th century.

Burby was  born in London and educated at Lincoln College, Oxford. He held livings at Canewdon, East Woodhay and Wonston. Roberts was Archdeacon of Winchester from 1631 until his death on 2 June 1653.

Notes

1653 deaths
People from Oxfordshire (before 1974)
Archdeacons of Winchester (ancient)
Alumni of Lincoln College, Oxford